"It Hurts So Good" is a song written by Phillip Mitchell, and first recorded in 1971 by Katie Love and the Four Shades of Black on the Muscle Shoals Sound label.  That version was not a hit, and the song was later recorded more successfully by Millie Jackson, whose 1973 recording was featured in the blaxploitation action film Cleopatra Jones.  Hit versions were also recorded by Susan Cadogan and Jimmy Somerville, both titled as "Hurt So Good".

Covers

Millie Jackson version

Millie Jackson's recording charted at #24 on the Billboard Hot 100 and #3 on what was then called R&B Singles.  It was used as the title track of her second album, It Hurts So Good.

Charts

Susan Cadogan version
Susan Cadogan released a reggae cover version of the song later that year retitled as "Hurt So Good", which featured bassist Boris Gardiner and the Zap Pow horns. It was released to little effect in Jamaica on Lee Perry's new 'Perries' record label, but was released in the UK by Dennis Harris's DIP International label. Magnet Records picked up the single and it went on to reach the top 5 of the UK Singles Chart, with Cadogan flying to London to promote the single, including a television appearance on Top of the Pops.

Charts

Jimmy Somerville version

Former Bronski Beat lead singer Jimmy Somerville covered the song in 1995, also titled as "Hurt So Good". It charted at #15 on the UK Singles Chart.

Charts

Other versions
Luminites, contestants on the seventh series of Britain's Got Talent.

References

1971 songs
1973 singles
1995 singles
Millie Jackson songs
Jimmy Somerville songs
London Records singles
Song recordings produced by Richard Stannard (songwriter)
Reggae songs